Munsell may refer to:

Albert Henry Munsell (1858–1918), American painter, teacher of art, and the inventor of the Munsell color system
Harvey M. Munsell, American soldier in the Civil War. 
Munsell Color Company
Munsell color system developed by the company above
Farnsworth-Munsell 100 hue test
Munsell, Missouri, a community in the United States

See also
Munsel